Anastasia Ilinichna Skoptsova (born 8 November 2000) is a Russian retired ice dancer. With her former skating partner, Kirill Aleshin, she was the 2020 Rostelecom Cup bronze medalist, 2018 CS Tallinn Trophy silver medalist, and 2021 Russian national bronze medalist.

Earlier in their career, they won gold at the 2018 World Junior Championships and 2017 Junior Grand Prix Final, as well as bronze at the 2016 Winter Youth Olympics.

Personal life 
Anastasia Ilinichna Skoptsova was born on 8 November 2000 in Moscow, Russia.

Career

Early years 
Skoptsova began learning to skate in 2004. She made her international debut in autumn 2010, competing with Nikita Nazarov on the advanced novice level at the Tirnavia Ice Cup and NRW Trophy. The two placed thirteenth at the 2012 Russian Junior Championships. They were coached by Denis Samokhin in Moscow.

Beginning of partnership with Aleshin 
Skoptsova and Kirill Aleshin teamed up after she contacted him through a Russian partner search. They began competing together in October 2013. They qualified to the 2015 Russian Junior Championships and finished ninth, having ranked ninth in the short and seventh in the free dance.

2015–2016 season: Junior Grand Prix debut 
Skoptsova/Aleshin's first Junior Grand Prix (JGP) assignments came in the 2015–2016 season. They won the bronze medal at the JGP in Toruń, Poland, after placing third in both segments behind Lorraine McNamara / Quinn Carpenter and Christina Carreira / Anthony Ponomarenko. At the JGP in Zagreb, Croatia, Skoptsova/Aleshin placed second in both segments and won the silver medal, scoring 12 points less than Rachel Parsons / Michael Parsons (gold) and almost five points more than Sofia Shevchenko / Igor Eremenko (bronze). Ranked 6th in the JGP standings, they took the final spot at the 2015–16 JGP Final in Barcelona, where they finished sixth. 

Fifth at the 2016 Russian Junior Championships (seventh in the short dance, fourth in the free), the two were named in Russia's team to the 2016 Winter Youth Olympics in Hamar. Ranked second in the short dance and third in the free, they were awarded the bronze medal in the ice dancing event in Norway. They won gold in the mixed NOC team event.

2016–2017 season 
In late September, Skoptsova/Aleshin won bronze at a JGP event in Ljubljana, Slovenia; they finished third behind Lorraine McNamara / Quinn Carpenter and Sofia Polishchuk / Alexander Vakhnov. A week later, they received silver at a JPG assignment in Tallinn, Estonia, where they placed second to Alla Loboda / Pavel Drozd. They finished as the first alternates for the JGP Final.

In February, Skoptsova/Aleshin took bronze at the 2017 Russian Junior Championships, finishing behind Anastasia Shpilevaya / Grigory Smirnov and Loboda/Drozd. They were included in Russia's team to the 2017 World Junior Championships, held in March in Taipei, Taiwan, and finished fifth overall after placing third in the short dance and fifth in the free dance.

2017–2018 season: World Junior title 
Skoptsova/Aleshin began their JGP season in September, in Minsk, Belarus; they were awarded the silver medal, having finished 6.41 points behind Christina Carreira / Anthony Ponomarenko of the United States. In October, they won gold at a JGP event in Gdańsk, Poland, defeating their closest rivals, Elizaveta Khudaiberdieva / Nikita Nazarov, by 16.93 points. Due to their results, they qualified to the 2017 Junior Grand Prix Final, held in December in Nagoya, Japan. They placed first in both segments in Japan, winning gold with a 1.85 point margin over silver medalists Carreira/Ponomarenko.

Skoptsova/Aleshin won gold at the 2018 Russian Junior Championships in January. They ranked first in both segments on their way to the gold medal at the 2018 World Junior Championships, held in March in Sofia, Bulgaria. They outscored the silver medalists (Carreira/Ponomarenko) by 7.47 points overall.

2018–2019 season: Senior debut 
Skoptsova suffered from a recurrence of an ankle injury over the summer that limited the duo's training time leading up to the new season. In late October Skoptsova/Aleshin made their international senior and Grand Prix debut at the 2018 Skate Canada where they placed 10th. Two weeks later they finished 7th at the 2018 NHK Trophy.

In late November Skoptsova/Aleshin won their first international senior medal at the 2018 CS Tallinn Trophy. Ranked first in the rhythm dance and third in the free dance they won the silver medal with their personal best score of 179.78 points.  At the 2019 Russian Championships, they placed fifth.

2019–2020 season 
Skoptcova (as she began identifying as in English transliteration) and Aleshin had to withdraw from the Russian test skates prior to skating their free dance due to Aleshin becoming ill, and withdrew from the Finlandia Trophy and the Ice Star.  Consequently, they started their competition season at the 2019 Cup of China on the Grand Prix, placing seventh.  At the 2019 Rostelecom Cup, they were ninth of ten teams.

Skoptcova/Aleshin placed fifth at the 2020 Russian Championships.

2020–2021 season: Grand Prix and national bronze medals 
Skoptcova/Aleshin debuted at the senior Russian test skates, repeating their programs from the previous season due to the COVID-19 pandemic. They competed on the domestic Cup of Russia series, winning the gold medal at stage four in Kazan by almost 34 points.

With the Grand Prix allotted based mainly on geographic location, Skoptcova/Aleshin competed at the 2020 Rostelecom Cup, placing third in the rhythm dance. Third in the free dance as well, they won their first Grand Prix medal, a bronze.

With reigning national champions Sinitsina/Katsalapov sitting out the 2021 Russian Championships due to COVID-19 illness, the bronze medal position on the national podium was widely perceived to be open to contest between several teams, Skoptcova/Aleshin among them.  They placed third in the rhythm dance.  Due to a twizzle error from Skoptcova, they placed fourth in the free dance, but remained in third place overall to take bronze, standing on the senior national podium for the first time.

Following the national championships, Skoptcova/Aleshin participated in the 2021 Channel One Trophy, a televised team competition held in lieu of the cancelled European Championships.  They were selected for the Time of Firsts team captained by Evgenia Medvedeva.  They placed third in both their segments of the competition, while their team finished in second overall.  They did not participate in the Russian Cup Final.

2021–2022 season 
Skoptsova and Aleshin debuted their programs at the Russian senior test skates. They won a gold medal at the 2021 CS Denis Ten Memorial Challenge, and then were sixth at the 2021 Rostelecom Cup. They went on to win another gold at the Santa Claus Cup.

At the 2022 Russian Championships, Skoptsova/Aleshin placed sixth. Speaking after the free dance, Skoptsova noted that Aleshin had had twizzle problems, but that otherwise she felt it "was emotional, soulful, beautiful, sublime, and tender and we are very proud of ourselves and the coaches." This would prove to be their final competition, as they announced their retirement at the end of the season, with Skoptsova intending to become a journalist.

Programs 
(with Aleshin)

Competitive highlights 
GP: Grand Prix; CS: Challenger Series; JGP: Junior Grand Prix

With Aleshin

With Nazarov

Detailed results 
Small medals for short and free programs awarded only at ISU Championships.

With Aleshin

References

External links 

 

2000 births
Russian female ice dancers
World Junior Figure Skating Championships medalists
Living people
Figure skaters from Moscow
Figure skaters at the 2016 Winter Youth Olympics
Youth Olympic gold medalists for Russia
21st-century Russian women